H.E. Mwangi Wa Iria (Born 28 August 1964) is the immediate former Governor of Murang'a County in Kenya. He is also the former vice chairman of the Council of Governors of Kenya, having been elected in January 2019. He was elected on the 4 March 2013 and subsequently in August 2017 for his second term. His famous campaign slogan is "Hapa kazi tu" (translated from the native kikuyu language, no wira tu). He won the 2013 Kenyan gubernatorial elections under The National Alliance ticket.

Education
Wa Iria attended Kiboi primary School and later Weithaga Boys High School. He is also an alumnus of Moi University and received training from the Chartered Institute of Procurement & Supply in the United Kingdom.

Career
Before joining politics, Wa Iria was the Managing Director of New Kenya Cooperative Creameries (KCC). He has also served as National Sales manager of Kenya Breweries Ltd, Managing Director of Ngano Feeds Ltd, CEO of Freshco Seeds and as General Manager of the Commercial Division of Industrial Promotion Services that brings together more than 30 companies owned by the Aga Khan Development Network.

References

External links 

1964 births
Living people
County Governors of Kenya
Jubilee Party politicians
Moi University alumni
People from Murang'a County